Tad Arnold Schroeder (February 29, 1936 - February 13th, 2022) was a former American football coach. He served as the head football coach at the  United States Coast Guard Academy in New London, Connecticut, for six seasons, from 1968to 1973, compiling a record of 29–31. Schroeder was an assistant football coach at the University of Cincinnati from 1958 to 1960 and at the United States Military Academy from 1962 to 1967.

References

Year of birth missing (living people)
1930s births
Living people
Army Black Knights football coaches
Cincinnati Bearcats football coaches
Coast Guard Bears football coaches